Sivalaya Ottam (Tamil Language:சிவாலய ஓட்டம்) (Malayalam language:ശിവാലയ ഓട്ടം) is a ritual marathon undertaken by the devotees to the 12 Siva shrines in the district of Kanyakumari on the day of Sivarathri.

From 2014 onwards the day was announced as a local holiday for the district.

Ottam route 

The Ottam begins at Thirumalai, the first Sivalayam and goes all through the next 10 temples before ending at Thirunattalam.

Rituals 

Special pujas will be conducted at temple at Thirumalai. The ritual begin after the devotees taking a holy-dip in the Thamirabharani  river at Munchirai, the first Sivalayam.  The participants wear saffron robes, hold a palm-leaf fan on their hand and chant the mantra  "Govinda... Gopaala..."  all through the whole day of running. The pilgrims receive the holy ashes, "Thiruneer" from all the eleven temples. The purpose for the pilgrimage is believed to be fulfilled only by receiving the Sandal-paste from the final Sankaranarayanar Temple at Thirunattalam. After this, it is also told that a worship at Adi Kesava Temple at Thiruvattar nearby is also very useful after this ceremony. The objective of the pilgrimage is to uphold that Siva and Vishnu are both the manifestations of one supreme being.

Before, the devotees observes a one-week fast. tender coconut  and tender palmyra  in the day time and tulsi-water at night are the only food items taken by the devotees during the fasting days.

See also

 Google Earth Project - Sivalaya Ottam
 Shivarathri App

References

http://www.hindudevotionalblog.com/2012/02/story-of-sivalaya-ottam.html
http://sivalayaottam.blogspot.in/p/history.html

Citations

Hindu practices
Hinduism in Tamil Nadu
Hinduism in Kerala
Hindu rituals

ta:சிவாலய ஓட்டம்